

Light On is a jazz album by trumpeter-composer Tom Harrell released in 2007 through HighNote Records. This is the first album recorded by Harrell's then recent quintet. The group went on to release five albums between 2007 and 2012 and forms the core of a sixth album released in 2013. The group consists of Wayne Escoffery on sax, Danny Grissett on piano, Ugonna Okegwo on bass, and Johnathan Blake on drums. In 2007, the album topped the U.S. jazz radio chart and received a SESAC jazz award in the following year.

Reception
In reviewing the album for AllMusic, jazz commentator Scott Yanow wrote, "Light On is a superior set of modern jazz". All About Jazz praised the group's cohesiveness and balance, and in particular noted Escoffery's delivery. Similarly JazzTimes called the quintet's delivery "immaculate".

Track listing

Notable personnel
Credits adapted from AllMusic.

Performers
 Tom Harrell – flugelhorn, trumpet
 Wayne Escoffery – tenor saxophone
 Danny Grissett – piano, Fender Rhodes
 Ugonna Okegwo – bass
 Johnathan Blake – drums

Production
 Don Sickler – producer
 Joe Fields – executive producer
 Rudy Van Gelder – engineer, mastering, mixing

References 

2007 albums
Tom Harrell albums
HighNote Records albums
Albums recorded at Van Gelder Studio